Lauren Rose Goodger (born 19 September 1986) is an English television personality, glamour model, media personality and columnist. She starred in the ITVBe reality show The Only Way Is Essex from 2010 until 2012, debuting in the first series before departing in series 6.

In January 2013, Goodger took part in the eighth series of the ITV ice skating show Dancing on Ice, in which she was partnered with Michael Zenezini and finished eleventh after being eliminated in week 2. In August 2014, Goodger entered the Celebrity Big Brother house  in the fourteenth series of the show.

Career

The Only Way Is Essex
Goodger was one of the original cast members of the reality television programme The Only Way Is Essex. The first two series of the show mostly evolved around Goodger's relationship with her boyfriend Mark Wright. In the series 2 finale, broadcast on 4 May 2011, she dumped Wright and pushed him into a swimming pool.

Goodger made a guest appearance in the series 16 Christmas Special in 2015, before returning as a regular cast member in series 19. She did not return for series 20.

Dancing on Ice

Celebrity Big Brother
In August 2014, Goodger participated in the fourteenth series of Celebrity Big Brother. She entered the house on Day 1, and has since been linked with Geordie Shore star Ricci Guarnaccio. On Day 14, Goodger was nominated by Frenchy, and therefore faced eviction. She survived this eviction on Day 17. On Day 21, She was nominated again, this time by Edele and James. On Day 24, Goodger became the seventh housemate to be evicted in a double eviction with Ricci.

Instagram 
Lauren has over 750,000 followers on Instagram which she uses to market products. In 2019 she, along with Mike Hassini and Zara Holland, auditioned to promote a fictitious diet product containing cyanide. The drink was created as part of an investigation by the BBC Three series Blindboy Undestroys the World into Instagram influencers' irresponsible marketing of products they have never used.

Personal life
Goodger was raised in Bethnal Green, London with her half-brother Tony and half-sister Nicola.

Goodger's relationship with boyfriend and fellow The Only Way Is Essex cast member Mark Wright lasted for ten years; she was aged 15 when they started dating and they split in 2012. 

Since 2020, Goodger has been dating Charles Drury. In January 2021, Goodger announced that she was pregnant with their first child. In July 2021, Goodger gave birth to a girl named Larose. In January 2022, Goodger announced that she was pregnant with their second child. In July 2022, Goodger revealed that their second daughter had died at two days old.

Television

Guest appearances
 Daybreak (15 May 2011, 6 March 2012) - 2 Episodes
 This Morning (16 May 2011, 3 January 2013, 14 January 2013, 15 February 2013, 1 August 2013) - 5 Episodes
 Loose Women (16 May 2011, 4 January 2016, 3 August 2016, 26 January 2017, 15 September 2017) - 5 Episodes
 The Wright Stuff (21 February 2013) - 1 Episode
 8 Out of 10 Cats (April 2014) - 1 Episode
 Big Brother's Bit on the Side (July, August, September) - 5 Episodes
 Celebrity Juice (25 September 2014) - 1 Episode
 Most Shocking Celebrity Moments 2014 (December 2014) - TV Documentary

See also
 List of Celebrity Big Brother (British TV series) housemates
 List of Dancing on Ice contestants

References

External links
 
 

1986 births
Living people
People from Brentwood, Essex
Television personalities from London
English television personalities
Television personalities from Essex
Glamour models